Daniel Friedmann (born 17 April 1936) is a former professor at and dean of the Tel Aviv University Faculty of Law. He served as the Minister of Justice of Israel from 2007 to 2009, having been appointed by then-Prime Minister Ehud Olmert. He was sworn in on February 7, 2007, succeeding Tzipi Livni. In 2009 he was succeeded by Ya'akov Ne'eman.

Early life
Friedmann was born in Mandatory Palestine into a family that has lived there for seven generations. He attended the Hebrew University of Jerusalem and Harvard Law School, receiving a doctorate from the former.

Academic career
Friedmann was previously a professor of law at Tel Aviv University in the 1960s and 70s, including a stint as dean of the faculty of law there between 1974 and 1978. He subsequently taught law in the United States at Harvard, Penn, and Fordham, and in the United Kingdom at Queen Mary, University of London.

Friedmann has authored numerous legal articles and treatises in Hebrew and English.

Awards and honours
Friedmann is the recipient of several Israeli and international awards, including the Zeltner Prize (awarded to an outstanding jurist), the Sussman Prize, the Minkoff Prize, and the Israel Prize, in 1991, for law.

Politics and government
Friedman had been a member of the now-defunct Democratic Movement for Change party, and later appeared at the symbolic 120th place on the Knesset electoral list of one of its successor parties, Shinui, in the 2003 elections.

Israeli Prime Minister Ehud Olmert appointed Friedmann as the Minister of Justice on February 6, 2007. He was confirmed by the Cabinet unanimously and by the Knesset (50-24-1) on February 7. He was sworn in the same day.

The initial reaction to appointment was mixed, but the commentators agree that Friedmann is strongly critical of the Israeli Judiciary. In the past Friedmann has declared a preference for reforming the system by which justices are appointed to the Israeli Supreme Court.

References

External links

Daniel Friedmann's Website
Daniel Friedmann's Website (Hebrew)
Tel Aviv University biography
Prof. Daniel Friedmann appointed Justice Minister, government press release

See also 
 List of Israel Prize recipients

1936 births
Living people
Government ministers of Israel
Deans of law schools in Israel
Israeli lawyers
Harvard Law School alumni
Academics of Queen Mary University of London
Israel Prize in law recipients
Israeli Jews
Israeli legal scholars
Members of the Israel Academy of Sciences and Humanities
Democratic Movement for Change politicians
Shinui politicians
Academic staff of Tel Aviv University
Academic staff of the College of Management Academic Studies
Hebrew University of Jerusalem alumni
People from Tel Aviv
Ministers of Justice of Israel
Israeli academic administrators